Topo Gigio originally known as "COCO GIGIO" was the lead character of a children's puppet show on Italian television in the early 1960s. The character, created in 1958 by artist Maria Perego, her husband Federico Caldura, and fellow artist Guido Stagnaro, debuted on Italian television in 1959 and has been customarily voiced by actor Giuseppe "Peppino" Mazzullo and later Davide Garbolino. The Italian nickname "Gigi" is a derivative of Luigi ("Louis"), so Topo Gigio could be translated as Louie Mouse.

Topo Gigio was very popular in Italy for many years—not only on TV, but also in children's magazines, such as the classical Corriere dei Piccoli, animated cartoons, merchandising and movies. In 1963, the character's popularity spread to the world after being featured on The Ed Sullivan Show in the U.S.

Today, Topo Gigio still has fans and has become an icon of Italian pop culture. He performs regularly at Zecchino d'Oro festival and other programs created by Antoniano and RAI. The character also spawned two feature-length motion pictures, The Magic World of Topo Gigio (1965) and Topo Gigio and the Missile War (1967), an anime series, and a 2020 animated series of the same name.

The puppet has made appearances and has a fan base in many other countries—including Argentina, Bolivia, Brazil, Chile, Colombia, Costa Rica, Dominican Republic, El Salvador, Ecuador, Guatemala, Japan, Mexico, Nicaragua, Honduras, Panama, Paraguay, Peru, Portugal, Puerto Rico, Romania, Spain, Uruguay, Venezuela and the former Yugoslavia.

Dedicated media

Television
Topo Gigio was created in 1958 by the artist "Madame" Maria Perego and Guido Stagnaro, and starred in a children's television show in Italy in the early 1960s. He remains a fixture of Italian pop culture and still performs regularly at festivals in Italy.
 He was immensely popular in his home country and became a worldwide sensation after his recurring appearances, beginning in 1963, on The Ed Sullivan Show, in the United States. Created by a troupe of Italian puppeteers, it took four people to bring the 10-inch-tall character to life: three to manipulate him, and one to create his voice. The puppet stood in a special "limbo" black art stage with black velvet curtains, designed to absorb as much ambient light as possible, which helped hide the puppeteers, who were also dressed in black from head to toe. Each puppeteer operated a different part of Gigio's foam rubber body by using several wooden dowel rods (also painted black). The illusion was quite remarkable, since unlike traditional hand puppets, Topo Gigio could actually appear to walk on his feet, sing, make subtle hand gestures, and even walk up Ed Sullivan's arm and perch on his shoulder. Careful lighting and TV camera adjustment made the "black art" illusion perfect for the television audience, though on at least one appearance, Ed asked the puppeteers to come out and take a bow, revealing their black-clad appearance (though deftly hiding Gigio's mechanisms to conceal the secret). In more than fifty appearances on the show, the mouse would appear on stage and greet Sullivan with, "Hello, Eddie!". Gigio would occasionally talk about his girlfriend, Rosie. Gigio ended his weekly visits by crooning to the host, "Eddie, kiss me goodnight!" (pronounced as "Keesa me goo'night!"). Topo Gigio closed Sullivan's final show in 1971.
 During the first half of the 1960s (especially in 1964), Topo Gigio also appeared in a TV music show presented by the British singer Chris Howland, both in Austria and Germany.
 Also in the early 1960s, in Austria, Mike Molto had a special small show to help the advertising industry. Austrian television advertising first started in 1959.
 In 1965, Topo Gigio appeared on the first of many occasions in ITV's Sunday Night at the London Palladium with Jimmy Tarbuck (Compere), Nina & Frederik and Lonnie Donegan.
In Hispanic America, Topo Gigio became a smash hit in 1968, featuring Braulio Castillo, Raúl Astor (Raúl Ignacio Spangenberg), and later, Julio Alemán.  The show was produced in Peru and then in Mexico. The character still appears in Italian and Spanish speaking territories.
A 1969 color television show especially for children in Austria and Switzerland was called Cappuccetto and Her Adventures with her friends Lupo Lupone, Professor Lhotko, a fox, some other animals of the forest, her grandmother, and a music band with five little mushrooms playing on guitars and singing.
The character was also introduced in Portugal, Japan, South America, and Spain. Topo Gigio, a Japanese animated television series produced by Nippon Animation, aired in Japan for two seasons, in 1988.
 In Portugal, Topo Gigio is loved by everyone. In 1979, Topo Gigio got his own tv Show in Portuguese television, with the voice of António Semedo, and presented by the Pianist, F.C. Porto aficionado,  and former Race Driver Rui Guedes. After that Topo Gigio had a nightly song for children to go to bed, he performed regularly on the show "Sequim d 'Ouro" in the 90's, and in 2000 Topo Gigio became part of the team of the most popular ever Tv Show in Portugal, the forever famous, unforgettable, and acclaimed "Big Show Sic", created and led by the also acclaimed Producer Ediberto Lima. Topo Gigio has engraved his beloved image, name, teachings, and character, in all, children and adults alike, hearts in Portugal.
An Italian animated series started being released on RaiPlay on April 8, 2020.

Films
The character has starred in several feature films, including:
 The feature film The Magic World of Topo Gigio (1961) is considered lost media. 
 Topo Gigio and the Missile War (1967), a Japanese-Italian international co-production film directed by Kon Ichikawa
 Topo Gigio no castelo do Conde Drácula (1989, Pedro Siaretta)

Music
 Topo Gigio had several LPs with songs sung by Gabriel Garzón.

Spokesperson and mascot
 Topo Gigio has been the official mascot of the Uruguayan club Huracán Buceo since 1968.

Appearances and references in popular culture

Schools
 In Fortaleza (Brazil), there is a school named after the character.

Sports
 Argentine footballer Carlos Tevez claimed that his goal celebrations were to honour Topo Gigio after Manchester City's 2–1 win over his former club and fierce rivals Manchester United in the League Cup semi-final first leg 2009/10 season. Tevez claimed that his Argentine team mate Juan Román Riquelme also honours Topo Gigio with his goal celebrations.

References

External links
 Official website
 
 
 
 
 
 
 
 
 
 
 Entry at 45cat.com

Male characters in television
Anthropomorphic mice and rats
Puppets
Italian television shows featuring puppetry
Italian children's television series

ar:مغامرات سوسان